Jesús María Ayala Sánchez (born 16 November 1993) is a Spanish footballer who plays for Mons Calpe as a left winger.

Club career
Born in Algeciras, Province of Cádiz, Ayala graduated from Recreativo de Huelva's youth system, making his senior debuts with the reserves in the 2011–12 season, in Tercera División. On 14 October 2012 he made his professional debut with the Andalusians, playing the last four minutes in a 2–5 away loss against Girona FC in the Segunda División.

On 21 June 2013 Ayala was loaned to Algeciras CF of the Segunda División B.

References

External links
 
 
 

1993 births
Living people
Spanish footballers
Footballers from Algeciras
Association football wingers
Segunda División players
Segunda División B players
Tercera División players
Atlético Onubense players
Recreativo de Huelva players
Algeciras CF footballers
CD San Roque footballers